Bob Sundvold (born June 15, 1955) is an American college basketball coach, currently head coach of the Tritons of the NCAA Division II University of Missouri–St. Louis.

Sundvold, the older brother of former NBA player Jon Sundvold, was an all-conference player at South Dakota State.  In 1978, he started his coaching career as an assistant to Norm Stewart at Missouri.  His first head coaching job came at Division II Central Missouri in 1992, where in four years his teams went 81–39 with three NCAA Tournament berths.  From there he moved to Division I UMKC, where he led the Kangaroos to a 43–70 mark from 1996 to 2000.

After spending several seasons as a college assistant coach, announcer, and professional coach in the American Basketball Association, Sundvold returned to college as a head coach in 2013 as he was named head coach of the University of Missouri–St. Louis.

References

External links
 UMSL Tritons profile

1955 births
Living people
American Basketball Association (2000–present) coaches
American men's basketball coaches
American men's basketball players
Basketball coaches from South Dakota
Basketball players from South Dakota
Central Missouri Mules basketball coaches
College basketball announcers in the United States
College men's basketball head coaches in the United States
Eastern Illinois Panthers men's basketball coaches
Junior college men's basketball players in the United States
Missouri State Bears basketball coaches
Missouri Tigers men's basketball coaches
South Dakota State Jackrabbits men's basketball players
Sportspeople from Sioux Falls, South Dakota
Toledo Rockets men's basketball coaches
Kansas City Roos men's basketball coaches
UMSL Tritons men's basketball coaches